Verkhnedneprovsky is an urban locality (an urban-type settlement) in Dorogobuzhsky District of Smolensk Oblast, Russia. Population:

References

Urban-type settlements in Smolensk Oblast
Populated places on the Dnieper in Russia